Ashington Association Football Club is a football club based in Ashington, Northumberland, England.

Formed in 1883, the club have played in a number of local and regional leagues, including the Northern Alliance, the East Northumberland League, the North Eastern League, the Midland League, Wearside League and the North Regional League. They were a founding member of the Football League Third Division North in 1921 and are the northernmost team to have played in the Football League. The club were later founder members of the Northern Premier League in 1968 and have been in the Northern League since 1970.

History

The club was established in 1883 and began entering the FA Cup in 1887. They joined the Northern Alliance at the start of the 1892–93 season when the league was expanded to twelve clubs. However, the league was reduced to ten club the following season, and as they had finished in the bottom two, Ashington were asked to leave. The club then ceased activities, but were brought back following a large meeting, joining the East Northumberland League in 1895. They went on to win the league title in 1897–98.

Ashington applied to rejoin the Northern Alliance in 1901, but were rejected. However, the following season they were elected back into the league, finishing second in the vote to admit three clubs. They won the league in 1913–14 and moved up to the North Eastern League. When football resumed after World War I the club rejoined the North Eastern League, where they remained until being elected into the new Third Division North of the Football League in 1921. After all the applications had been considered by the League, Ashington were one of fourteen clubs marked out for admission in a single bloc, which they duly were. In 1926–27 the club recorded its best performance in the FA Cup, reaching the third round, where they lost 2–0 at home to Nottingham Forest. After finishing bottom of the division in 1928–29 the club lost their bid for re-election, receiving only 14 votes to the 24 received by non-League York City.

Ashington subsequently dropped into Division Two of the North Eastern League as Division One had no spaces. With only two clubs eligible for promotion, Ashington appeared to have missed out after finishing third. However, runners-up White-le-Head declined the opportunity of promotion, allowing Ashington to move up to Division One. Five years later the league was reduced to a single division, where they remained until the league folded in 1958 due to the resignation of the Football League clubs' reserve teams, unsuccessfully applying for election to the Football League in 1947 (when no vote took place) and 1950 (when they received no votes).

Alongside several other former North Eastern League clubs, Ashington switched to the Midland League. In 1960 they were founder members of the Northern Counties League, finishing as runners-up in its first season. The North Eastern League was re-established in 1962, but lasted only two seasons. Ashington spent the 1964–65 season in the Wearside League before joining the North Regional League, which was largely composed of Football League reserve teams. They remained in the league for three seasons, before becoming founder members of the Northern Premier League in 1968. In the first season of the league, the club finished third-from-bottom and resigned due to the costs of being in the league. They spent a single season back in the Northern Alliance, before joining the Northern League in 1970. In 1973–74 they reached the semi-finals of the last-ever FA Amateur Cup, losing 3–0 to eventual winners Bishop's Stortford in a replay.

In 1981 a second division was added to the league, with Ashington remaining in Division One. However, after finishing second-from-bottom in 1983–84 they were relegated to Division Two. In 2000–01 they won Division Two, earning promotion to Division One. However, they spent only a single season in Division One before being relegated back to Division Two. After finishing fifth in 2002–03, they won Division Two again in 2003–04 and were promoted back to Division One. In 2012–13 they won the Northumberland Senior Cup for the tenth time with a 3–0  win over Whitley Bay.

Season-by-season

Colours and crest
Ashington's colours are black and white vertical stripes, used on the shirt and paired with black shorts and black socks for home matches. While away, they use an all light blue shirt and socks with white shorts.

The Ashington AFC badge has two lions flanking a badge with a stylised AFC logo, with a football between the legs of the A.

Ground
Ashington moved a new ground named Station Road in 1909, which was renamed Portland Park in 1914. They played at Portland Park during their Football League years, with the club's first Football League match attracting a crowd of 9,000. They remained at Portland Park after dropping out of the league, with the club's record attendance of 13,199 coming for an FA Cup second round tie with Rochdale on 9 December 1950.

In 2008 the club left Portland Park to move to Woodhorn Lane. The final match was played at the old ground in February 2008 against Seaham Red Star, attracting a crowd of 1,954. The first game at Woodhorn Lane took place on 30 August 2008 against Ossett Albion, with 341 spectators watching a 2–1 win for Ashington in an FA Cup preliminary round game.

Honours
Northern League
Division Two champions 2000–01, 2003–04
Ernest Armstrong Memorial Cup winners 1998–99, 2002–03
Division One Cup 2021–22
Northern Alliance
Champions 1913–14
East Northumberland League
Champions 1897–98
Northumberland Senior Cup
Winners 1920–21, 1932–33, 1938–39, 1949–50, 1955–56, 1956–57, 1961–62, 1966–67, 1979–80, 2012–13

Records
Best FA Amateur Cup performance: Semi-finals, 1973–74
Best FA Cup performance: Third round, 1926–27
Best FA Trophy performance: second round 1979–80, 1980–81, 1982–83
Best FA Vase performance: Fifth round, 2011–12
Record attendance:
At Portland Park: 13,199 vs Rochdale, FA Cup second round, 9 December 1950
At Woodhorn Lane: 1,424 vs Stocksbridge Park Steels, FA Cup third qualifying round replay, 4 October 2022

See also
Ashington A.F.C. players
Ashington A.F.C. managers

References

External links
Official website

 
Football clubs in England
Football clubs in Northumberland
Association football clubs established in 1883
1883 establishments in England
Northern Football Alliance
East Northumberland League
North Eastern League
Former English Football League clubs
North Regional League
Northern Premier League clubs
Wearside Football League
Midland Football League (1889)
Northern Football League
Ashington